Phyllocnistis wampella is a moth of the family Gracillariidae, known from Guangdong, China. The hostplant for the species is Clausena lansium.

References

Phyllocnistis
Endemic fauna of China